Gongyuanqian Station is an interchange station of Line 1 and Line 2 of the Guangzhou Metro. It started operation on 28June 1999 and is located under People's Park in Yuexiu District of Guangzhou.

Station layout

Due to being an interchange between two busy lines and serving a major office and shopping district, it's one of the busiest stations of the Guangzhou Metro. Both the line 1 and line 2 stations adopt the Spanish solution to separate boarding and alighting passengers on both lines. When the train arrives at the platform, train doors and platform screen doors on the right side are opened first to allow passengers to get off. Then those on the left side are opened to allow passengers to get on.

Exits
The station has 12 exits, lettered A, B, C, D, E, F, G, H, I (I1, I2), J and K.

References

Railway stations in China opened in 1999
Guangzhou Metro stations in Yuexiu District